Court Street may refer to:

Court Street (Boston), a street in Boston, Massachusetts
Illinois Route 9, known as Court Street in Pekin, Illinois
New York State Route 298, known as Court Street in Syracuse, New York
Court Street School, a historic building in Freehold Borough, Monmouth County, New Jersey
South Court Street, Montgomery, Alabama

See also
Court Street Bridge (disambiguation)
Court Street Historic District (disambiguation)
Court Street Station (disambiguation)